Dual-member proportional representation (DMP), also known as dual-member mixed proportional, is an electoral system designed to produce proportional election results across a region by electing two representatives in each of the region’s districts. The first seat in every district is awarded to the candidate who receives the most votes, similar to first-past-the-post voting (FPTP). The second seat is awarded to one of the remaining district candidates so that proportionality is achieved across the region, using a calculation that aims to award parties their seats in the districts where they had their strongest performances.

DMP was invented in 2013 by a University of Alberta mathematics student named Sean Graham. The system was intended as a possible replacement for FPTP in Canadian national and provincial elections. Whereas campaigns to adopt mixed-member proportional representation (MMP) or the single transferable vote (STV) had recently been defeated in a number of Canadian provinces (see 2005 British Columbia referendum, 2005 Prince Edward Island referendum, 2007 Ontario referendum, 2009 British Columbia referendum), the intent behind DMP was to gain broader acceptance by retaining salient features of FPTP. These features include a one-vote ballot, relatively small districts (compared with STV), and a single tier of local representatives (in contrast to MMP).

Proposals to consider DMP were submitted to the Government of Canada, Alberta, Prince Edward Island (PEI), and British Columbia (BC). In April 2016, the PEI Special Committee on Democratic Renewal officially recommended that DMP appear as one of five options on the 2016 PEI plebiscite, with the winning voting system determined by instant-runoff voting. The plebiscite took place from October 29 to November 7, 2016. DMP was eliminated on the third round, and after its votes were redistributed MMP was declared the winner ahead of FPTP. (The referendum was non-binding and the government of the time ignored the result.) In May 2018, DMP was one of three proportional systems selected to appear on the 2018 BC referendum. The referendum involved a two-question mail-in ballot to be returned by the extended deadline of December 7, 2018. On the first question, a 61% majority of voters chose to retain the current FPTP voting system instead of switching to a form of proportional representation. On the second question, which would have decided the specific proportional system, MMP enjoyed the most support, with DMP collecting slightly more first-choice preferences than rural–urban proportional representation.

Voting

Under DMP, a voter receives a district-specific ballot paper with several options. Each option is of one of the following types:

 a pair of ranked candidates (primary and secondary) affiliated with the same party;
 a sole candidate affiliated with a party;
 an independent candidate.

Similar to FPTP, a voter selects one option on the ballot. The distinguishing feature of a DMP ballot is that parties may list two candidates. If a party nominates two candidates, a vote for the party initially supports the primary candidate. The secondary candidate is only considered if the primary candidate has won the district's first seat; in this case, the party's district votes are transferred to the secondary candidate at half their value. This gives the secondary candidate a chance to be elected as well, but the 50% weighting makes it challenging for a party to win both seats in a single district. In a typical district, the primary candidates of two different parties will be elected.

A vote for a party-affiliated candidate (or pair of candidates) influences the outcome of an election in the following ways:

 It first helps the primary candidate of a voter's chosen party win their district's first seat. If a voter's chosen party receives a plurality of the votes in the district (more votes than any other party or independent candidate), that party's primary candidate wins the district's first seat. In this circumstance, a vote then helps the secondary candidate (if applicable) of the chosen party be elected to the second seat in the district.
 If a voter's chosen party does not win the district's first seat, their vote helps the party's primary candidate obtain the second seat.
 A vote for any party increases their share of the popular vote in the encompassing region, which is the primary determinant of the number of seats the party will win.

A vote for an independent candidate helps him or her obtain one of the district's two seats. An independent candidate who receives the most votes in the district (i.e. a plurality of the votes) wins the district's first seat, similar to a party-affiliated candidate. But unlike a party-affiliated candidate, an independent obtains the second seat only by placing second in the district. By contrast, a party-affiliated candidate who places second, third, fourth, etc., may or may not win the second seat, depending on the candidate's individual vote share as well as the party's share of the popular vote in the encompassing region.

Calculation
Once the votes in every district are counted, the seats are awarded according to the following procedure.

Step 1: Allocate seats to parties
Each party is allocated a certain number of seats in proportion to their share of the popular vote in the region.

The definitive report on DMP recommends that the seat allocation be calculated using the largest remainder method with a Hare quota and a total number of seats equal to twice the number of districts. Only votes cast for party-affiliated candidates are included in this calculation. The number of seats allocated must be adjusted if independents are elected (as this takes seats away from the parties), or if a party wins more than its proportional share of the seats based on plurality (see Step 2).

Step 2: Award seats based on plurality, and transfer votes
At least half the seats in the region are awarded based on a form of plurality. Most notably, the first seat in every district is awarded to the primary candidate with the greatest number of votes.

If the winning primary candidate is from a party that has also listed a secondary candidate on the ballot, then the votes are transferred at half weight to the secondary candidate. For example, if a party has won a district with 48% of the votes, their primary candidate is elected and the secondary candidate is treated as having a 24% vote share. After the vote transfer, if the remaining candidate with the highest vote share in any district is an independent, he or she is elected. All other independent candidates are eliminated.

Step 3: Award remaining allocated seats
At this point, most (if not all) districts in the region will have one unassigned seat. Each of these unfilled seats must be awarded to one of the remaining party-affiliated candidates. Each party's remaining candidates in the region are sorted from most popular to least popular according to the percentage of votes they received in their districts. Seats are then tentatively assigned to the most popular candidates in each party. The number of seats assigned in this manner is the number of seats initially allocated to each party in Step 1, minus the seats each party received in Step 2.

After the allocated seats are tentatively assigned, it may be necessary to resolve conflicts. A conflict is a situation where more than one candidate has been assigned a district's second seat. In such cases, the candidate with the highest percentage of votes retains his or her assigned seat, while the other candidates are eliminated. If a candidate is eliminated in this fashion, the seat that was tentatively assigned to him or her is re-assigned to the party's most popular candidate still awaiting a seat. The re-assignment may produce another conflict, which must itself be resolved. The process continues until no conflicts remain. At that point, any candidate with an assigned seat is elected. The order in which conflicts are resolved has no bearing on which candidates ultimately obtain seats.

It is possible for a party to run out of qualified candidates, in which case they may forfeit one or more of their allocated seats. This situation can occur only if the party nominates fewer than two candidates in at least one district, or if one or more of their candidates fails to meet the district threshold. All forfeited seats are re-allocated on a proportional basis by applying the calculation in Step 1 to the parties still eligible for seats. These re-allocated seats are then awarded by performing Step 3 an extra time.

Parameters
The DMP algorithm is designed to elect the most popular candidates in a region while satisfying two conditions. The first condition is that every district must elect two representatives. The second condition is that the total number of seats received by each party reflects, as closely as possible, their share of the popular vote. The basic calculation satisfies the two conditions while tending to elect candidates with relatively high levels of support. However, a small number of seats may be awarded to candidates with relatively low levels of support. To discourage the election of unpopular candidates, DMP can be implemented using a district threshold, a reserve factor, or both of these parameters.

District threshold
A district threshold is a minimum fraction of district votes required to be considered electable. If a candidate's vote share falls short of the district threshold, he or she is eliminated. The main purpose of this parameter is to allow voters in a district to reject an unpopular candidate, even if the candidate is most eligible to receive a seat allocated to his or her party.

The elimination of one or more candidates may cause a party to forfeit a seat, which is then re-allocated on a proportional basis. Since small parties are more likely to lose allocated seats in this manner, and major parties are most likely to receive re-allocated seats, a district threshold may reduce the proportionality of the election results. A district threshold can be used on its own, or in conjunction with a regional threshold (a minimum fraction of the popular vote).

The definitive report on DMP recommends a district threshold of 5%.

Reserve factor
A reserve factor is a fraction of a party's allocated seats (rounded down) that are set aside to be awarded in a later stage of the calculation. The seats set aside are collectively referred to as reserve seats. The reserve seats are awarded by re-applying Step 3 (see Calculation section). These extra steps occur immediately before the re-allocation of forfeited seats.

The purpose of a reserve factor is to reduce the probability that any party elects their least popular candidates across the region. Even without a reserve factor, the DMP algorithm inherently disfavours these candidates. Nevertheless, a small party may elect a comparatively unpopular candidate if their top-performing candidates are all defeated at the district level. Employing a reserve factor, a small party has a greater chance of having multiple eligible candidates at the point when their allocated seats are to be awarded to candidates. The seats will then go to popular candidates at the expense of unpopular candidates.

The definitive report recommends an inverse relationship between the reserve factor and the number of districts in a region. The following numbers are given:

As an example, a reserve factor of 15% (rounded down) means that a maximum of 15% of each party's seats are reserved for assignment in a second round of the DMP algorithm. Large parties will therefore have at least 85% of their caucuses elected from their best-performing candidates, and small parties will be allowed to win districts against candidates that would have formed the last 15% of these caucuses.

Comparison with mixed-member proportional representation
Dual-member proportional representation is related to mixed-member proportional representation in that one set of seats is awarded based on plurality, while the remaining seats are allocated to underrepresented parties in a compensatory manner. From a mathematical standpoint, the compensatory seats in MMP are analogous to the second district seats in DMP. Both DMP and MMP can be considered mixed electoral systems, meaning that two types of calculation methods are combined. The "mixed" aspect of DMP is reflected in the system's original name: dual-member mixed proportional.

Of the various forms of MMP, DMP has most in common with the "best near-winner" system (second mandate, Zweitmandat) used in the German state of Baden-Württemberg. Whereas most implementations of MMP provide electors with two votes, both DMP and the Baden-Württemberg system employ a one-vote ballot. The number of votes candidates receive determines their eligibility for both the first set of seats (based on plurality) and the second set of seats (based in part on the popular vote).

Although MMP and DMP are both mixed systems, the main difference is that MMP features two tiers of representatives whereas DMP has only a single tier. Under MMP, the first set of elected candidates serve a district whereas the other representatives serve the entire region. Under DMP, every elected candidate serves the district that he or she contested. Thus while the DMP calculation is comparable to that of MMP, the resulting form of governance is similar to that of the single transferable vote and other systems based on multi-seat districts.

Advantages of DMP over MMP
 DMP will tend to produce a more geographically balanced representation of the electorate. Compared with MMP, DMP reduces the likelihood that a disproportionate number of elected representatives will share an association with a particular district.
 DMP allows any seat to be obtained by an independent candidate. Although party-affiliated candidates benefit from the possibility of being elected despite a third- or fourth-place finish, independents have a compensating advantage in that they alone secure a seat by placing second. Under MMP, independents are strictly disadvantaged in that they are ineligible for the compensatory seats.
 DMP prevents a major party from essentially guaranteeing the election of particular candidates by placing them near the top of a party list. It is worth noting that this issue is also addressed by open-list MMP, a variant used in Bavaria where electors vote for individual list candidates.
 DMP avoids certain forms of tactical voting associated with MMP. Under MMP, an elector may give the first vote to his or her second- or third-favourite candidate if the favourite candidate has little chance of winning the district seat. Also, an elector may give the second vote to a second- or third-favourite party if his or her favourite party is expected to win so many districts seats that they become ineligible for compensatory seats. It is worth noting that the Zweitmandat variant of MMP used in Baden-Württemberg also addresses these tactics.

Advantages of MMP over DMP
 MMP accommodates somewhat smaller districts than DMP, since with MMP it is possible to award fewer than half the seats in a compensatory manner.
 Some forms of MMP can give voters more options. For instance, in a two-vote open-list system such as the one used in Bavaria, voters choose both a local and a regional candidate; for the regional candidate, they have many options within each party. In DMP, by contrast, voters have only one option per party. 
 Lessons can be learned from current and former usage of MMP – i.e., there is prior experience to guide.
 Both open-list MMP and best near-winner MMP award compensatory seats strictly to the most popular remaining candidates of each party. Under DMP, one or more of a party's most popular candidates might be denied seats if they place third or lower at the district level. If this occurs for all of a small party’s candidates who placed above the district threshold, that party will forfeit one or more seats.
 In a province large enough to have regions within the province, every voter for a party winning enough votes to elect a regional MP will have, rather than only two MPs, an MP from their party elected by voters in that region, accountable to that region. And in smaller provinces, every voter for a party winning enough votes will have an MP from their party elected by voters in that province, accountable to that province.

See also 

 Sekihairitsu
 Zweitmandat
 Proportional representation
 Binomial voting
 Mixed electoral system
 Electoral system
 List of electoral systems by country
 2018 British Columbia electoral reform referendum
 2016 Prince Edward Island electoral reform referendum

References

External links
 Dual Member Proportional – A New Electoral System For Canada

Non-monotonic electoral systems
Mixed electoral systems
Proportional representation electoral systems
Canadian inventions
Electoral reform in Canada